Hierodula membranacea is a large praying mantis, sharing its common name giant Asian mantis with other large members of genus Hierodula: of which it is the type species. Its colours vary from green to yellow-green, or even brown to reddish-brown, similar to those of the giant Indian mantis and the giant Malaysian mantis. As the name suggests, it originates from south-eastern Asia and is among the largest of mantises. It is a cannibalistic species, with the females sometimes eating the males after mating.

Habitat 
Hierodula membranacea inhabits in shrubs and tree areas.

Biology

Diet 
As with other mantis species, H. membranacea is particularly cannibalistic, which is thought to increase female fecundity. These huge insects can also tackle highly predatory hornets such as the Asian Giant hornet.

Gallery

Moulting
Like all arthropods Mantises have a hard shell called an exoskeleton. As they grow, they moult this exoskeleton to allow further growth until they reach their mature size, after which molting will be unnecessary. During the molting process, H. membranacea often does not eat, and avoids exposure to predators as its new shell will initially be soft and vulnerable.

Reproduction 
Reproduction occurs sexually in Hierodula membranacea, with very limited parthenogenesis abilities. A female can be identified from male by her six abdominal segments, whereas males have eight. She also has a much larger abdomen.

After mating, the female may attempt to eat the male to increase fertility, which will entail a struggle. The adult female will lay several egg cases (called oothecae) over her lifespan. From each of these oothecae, up to 150 nymphs hatch after six to eight weeks.

Behaviour 
This mantis can jump around twice its body length, and although adults are capable of flight, some females occasionally have been known to jump as adults. When cornered by predators, the mantis will adopt a threat display wherein it rears back with its wings and forelegs spread and mouth opened. Should a predator ignore the display, the mantis will strike out with its forelegs and bite. While mantises are not venomous, such a defensive attack from this large species can be painful and possibly break the skin.

See also
List of mantis species and genera

References

membranacea
Mantodea of Asia
Insects of India
Insects of Laos
Insects of Malaysia
Insects of Thailand
Insects of Vietnam
Insects of Myanmar
Insects of Cambodia
Insects of Singapore
Insects described in 1838